Albacete Fútbol Sala is a futsal club based in Albacete, the capital city of the province of Albacete in the autonomous community of Castile-La Mancha.

The club was founded in 1984 and its pavilion is Pabellón Universitario with capacity of 1,200 seaters.

The club's bat on the badge is similar to that of the city's football (soccer) team, Albacete Balompié.

History

Rise to Honor Division

Descent to National A division

Season to season

1 season in Primera División
14 seasons in Segunda División
3 season in Segunda División B
2 season in Tercera División

External links
Albacete FS Official Website
Albacete Twitter

Futsal clubs in Spain
Sport in Albacete
Futsal clubs established in 1984
1984 establishments in Spain
Sports teams in Castilla–La Mancha